Threat level is a term used by governments to indicate the state of preparedness required by government servants with regard to threats to the state:

Current
UK Threat Levels, the system used by the United Kingdom since 2006
National Terrorism Advisory System, the system used by the United States since 2011

Former
BIKINI state, the system used by the United Kingdom 1970–2006
Homeland Security Advisory System, the system used by the United States 2002–2011